Oakwood Hills is a village in McHenry County, Illinois, United States. It was founded in 1959. The population was 2,076 at the 2020 census.

Geography
Oakwood Hills is located in southeastern McHenry County at  (42.247658, -88.245176). It is southeast of Prairie Grove, east of Crystal Lake, and north of Cary. The Fox River passes  to the east.

Silver Lake is in the western part of the village, draining east to the Fox River. The unincorporated community of Silver Lake borders Oakwood Hills to the south.

Demographics

2020 census

2000 Census
As of the census of 2000, there were 2,194 people, 719 households, and 598 families residing in the village. The racial makeup of the village was 98.04% White, 0.36% African American, 0.23% Native American, 0.32% Asian, 0.18% from other races, and 0.87% from two or more races. Hispanic or Latino of any race were 3.37% of the population.

There were 719 households, out of which 47.8% had children under the age of 18 living with them, 73.2% were married couples living together, 6.8% had a female householder with no husband present, and 16.8% were non-families. 11.8% of all households were made up of individuals, and 2.2% had someone living alone who was 65 years of age or older. The average household size was 3.05 and the average family size was 3.34.

In the village, the population was spread out, with 31.5% under the age of 18, 7.1% from 18 to 24, 35.2% from 25 to 44, 22.3% from 45 to 64, and 3.9% who were 65 years of age or older. The median age was 34 years. For every 100 females, there were 102.4 males. For every 100 females age 18 and over, there were 99.9 males.

The median income for a household in the village was $68,182, and the median income for a family was $70,875. Males had a median income of $52,051 versus $30,508 for females. The per capita income for the village was $26,397. About 3.9% of families and 5.0% of the population were below the poverty line, including 4.2% of those under age 18 and 4.3% of those age 65 or over.

Proposed natural gas power plant

During the summer of 2014, the residents of Oakwood Hills and surrounding communities voiced their concerns about the creation of a power plant, by Northland Power and Enventure Partners, on property just north of the village. A group of concerned citizens hired expert Robert G. Abboud to create an impact assessment of the proposed project. The report emphasized risks to groundwater, air quality, and noise issues, among others as to why the project needed to be further studied.

See also
 Lake Killarney (Illinois)

References

External links
 

Villages in McHenry County, Illinois
Villages in Illinois
Chicago metropolitan area